Big Music (also known as Reliance Big Music) is an Indian record label owned by Anil Ambani. It is  a part of Reliance Entertainment, a subsidiary of Reliance Anil Dhirubhai Ambani Group.

The label was started in 2005, along with several other subsidiaries of Reliance Big Entertainment. BIG Music is the exclusive licensee in India to Universal Pictures International, Warner Home Video, Paramount Home Entertainment Global & DreamWorks Animation. They had also launched  an artist-management division called Big Talent in 2008, which is the second local label after Columbia Records India to offer artists 360-degree deals.

In 2008, T-Series acquired the music catalog of Big music, as  they cut a deal with  them along with web portal Bollywood Hungama, where all three companies will co-own the current and future music catalogue of Big Entertainment and the same shall be exclusively distributed by T-Series on all platforms in all formats including   the current titles in the Big Music catalogue and all future titles in Reliance Big Entertainment including all physical formats, Radio & Television, Mobile and digital formats, across the globe.

Soundtracks
 2017 Golmaal Again
 2014 Bobby Jasoos
 2014 Singham Returns
 2012 Bumboo
 2011 Singham
 2011 Taalismaan
 2011 Will To Live
 2010 Golmaal 3
 2010 Ada... A Way of Life
 2009 Do Knot Disturb
 2009 Baabarr
 2009 Daddy Cool
 2009 Sikandar
 2009 Kal Kissne Dekha
 2009 13B
 2008 Luck By Chance
 2008 Golmaal Returns
 2008 Ek Vivaah Aisa Bhi
 2008 1920
 2008 Rock On!!
 2008 Love Story 2050
 2008 Summer 2007
 2007 Khoya Khoya Chand
 2007 Mumbai Salsa
 2007 Chhodon Naa Yaar
 2007 Go
 2007 Johnny Gaddaar
 2007 Dil Dosti Etc
 2007 Dhamaal
 2007 Marigold: An Adventure in India
 2007 Cash
 2006 Golmaal: Fun Unlimited

See also
 List of record labels

External links 
  Reliance Big Music Home Video Official Website
 Big Music Filmography at Bollywood Hungama

References

Record label distributors
Indian music record labels
Companies based in Mumbai
Reliance Entertainment subsidiaries
2005 establishments in Maharashtra
Indian companies established in 2005
Record labels established in 2005